Dejan Lazarević (1959 in Sarajevo) is a Bosnian singer, best known internationally for his participation in the Eurovision Song Contests in 1994 together with Alma Čardžić.

References

Living people
20th-century Bosnia and Herzegovina male singers
Eurovision Song Contest entrants for Bosnia and Herzegovina
Eurovision Song Contest entrants of 1994
Place of birth missing (living people)
1966 births